Korokke is a Japanese deep-fried yōshoku dish originally related to a French dish, the croquette. Korokke is made by mixing cooked chopped meat, seafood, or vegetables with mashed potato or white sauce, usually shaped like a flat patty, rolling it in wheat flour, eggs, and Japanese-style breadcrumbs, then deep-frying this until brown on the outside.

History 
In 1887, the French croquette was introduced to Japan. It is thought that the korokke using mashed potatoes was invented because dairy processing technology had not been popularized in Japan at that time. The first mention of a "kuroketto" appears in cookery books from the Meiji era.

Korokke can be found in almost every supermarket and convenience store in Japan and enjoyed for its taste and its low cost.

Korokke became associated with typhoons in the 2000s, after a user on 2channel said they were eating some to prepare for an approaching typhoon, beginning a tradition that persisted on Japanese social media.

Varieties 
There are numerous types of korokke depending on the main ingredient or the ingredient mixed and they are generally named (ingredient) korokke.  
 Potato korokke - korokke made using potatoes 
 Meat korokke - korokke made with ground meat and potatoes. If made with meat only, it is menchi-katsu. 
 Tuna korokke - korokke with tuna
 Yasai (vegetable) korokke - korokke with mixed vegetables
 Curry korokke - curry-flavored korokke
 Kabocha (pumpkin) korokke - korokke made using pumpkins
 Okara korokke - korokke made using okara 
 Cream korokke - korokke made with white sauce
 Guratan korokke - korokke with white sauce and macaroni 
Korokke are sometimes sold wrapped in paper. They may also be used as a topping for other dishes.  When sandwiched between two slices of bread, they are called korokke pan (pan being 'bread' in Japanese), or korokke sando ('sandwich'). Gurakoro is a product introduced by the Japanese McDonald's which is made by sandwiching guratan korokke.

See also

References

External links

Simple Korokke Recipe
Japan Guide - Korokke

Japanese cuisine terms
Japanese fusion cuisine
Street food in South Korea
Palauan cuisine